Eastlake/124th station (sometimes stylized as Eastlake•124th) is a station on the N Line of the Denver RTD commuter rail system. It is the line's northern terminal station and is located in Thornton, Colorado. The station opened on September 21, 2020.

References

RTD commuter rail stations
Railway stations in the United States opened in 2020
2020 establishments in Colorado
Thornton, Colorado